Lalpur is an upazila of Natore District in the Division of Rajshahi, Bangladesh.

Geography
It has a total area of 327.92 km2. 29 km distance from Natore Sadar. Its Thana Sadar is situated on the bank of the river Padma.

The Upazila is bounded by  Bagha Upazila on west, little part of Daulatpur Upazila, Kushtia and Bheramara Upazila on south, Ishwardi Upazila on east, Baraigram Upazila and Bagatipara Upazila on north.

Climate
It's located in an area which is the hottest in Bangladesh. If temperature comes up to 43 °C in the summer.

All the year round, temperature remains hottest simultaneously. Rainfalls are recorded lowest in this part of Bangladesh.

Economy
The economy is based on agriculture. Most people are farmers. They produce agriculture crops throughout the year. Paddy, wheat, jute, and sugarcane, are common crops along with potato, pulse fisheries, dairies are the principal crops. North Bengal Sugar Mills in Gopalpur is one of the largest sugar mills in Bangladesh, and produce huge amount of sugar from sugarcane. Farmers also produce huge amounts of date juice in winter and make candy from its remains. Later it is sold to other parts of Bangladesh. Farmers also produce crops for their daily livelihoods. Local varieties of produce include fruits such as mango, jack fruit, banana, guava, black berry, and coconut. After fulfilling their own demand, farmers supply the remainder of their crop to markets all over the country. There are people who live near to Padma; most of time they fish in the river and sell their catches to local fish market to earn money for their living. Many NGOs play a role in national economic growth. These include organizations such as AVA, BRAC, Grameen Bank, SETU, DISHA, UDDIPAN, TMSS and so on.

Demographics

According to the 2011 Bangladesh census, Lalpur Upazila had 66,417 households and a population of 274,405, 7.7% of whom lived in urban areas. 9.4% of the population was under the age of 5. The literacy rate (age 7 and over) was 50.6%, compared to the national average of 51.8%.

Administration
Lalpur Thana was formed in 1869 and it was turned into an upazila on 15 April 1983.

Lalpur Upazila is divided into Gopalpur Municipality and ten union parishads: Arbab, Arjunpur, Bilmaria, Chongdhupoil, Duaria, Durduria, Iswardi, Kadamchilan, Lalpur, and Oalia. The union parishads are subdivided into 214 mauzas and 217 villages.

Gopalpur Municipality is subdivided into 9 wards and 16 mahallas.

See also
Upazilas of Bangladesh
Districts of Bangladesh
Divisions of Bangladesh

References

Upazilas of Natore District